Tatachilla is a semi-rural suburb of Adelaide, South Australia. It lies within the City of Onkaparinga. It is the location of the Tatachilla Lutheran College.

References

Suburbs of Adelaide